The Czech Basketball Player of the Year is the annual award for the best men's Czech basketball player. From 1965 to 1991, the award was for the best male basketball player from the nation of Czechoslovakia, and since 1992, the award is for the best male basketball player from the nation of the Czech Republic.

Czechoslovakian Player of the Year (1965–1991)
The award for the best men's basketball player of the year, with Czechoslovakian citizenship, from 1965 to 1991.

Czechoslovak Basketball League All-Star Five
The Czechoslovak Basketball League All-Star Five consisted of the five basketball players that were voted as being the best players of each season's Czechoslovak Basketball League. The teams were selected from the 1964–65 season, through the 1991–92 season.

1964–65: František Konvička, Jiří Zídek Sr., Jiří Růžička, Vladimír Pištělák, Jan Bobrovský

1965–66: Jiří Zídek Sr., František Konvička, Jan Bobrovský, Jiří Růžička, Karel Baroch

1966–67: Jiří Zídek Sr., Jiří Zedníček, Jan Bobrovský, František Konvička, Jiří Růžička

1967–68: František Konvička, Jiří Zídek Sr., Vladimír Pištělák, Jan Bobrovský, Jiří Růžička

1968–69: Jiří Zedníček, Jiří Zídek Sr., František Konvička, Vladimír Pištělák, Jan Bobrovský

1969–70: Jiří Růžička, Jiří Zídek Sr., Jiří Zedníček, Milan Voračka, Jan Bobrovský

1970–71: Jiří Zídek Sr., Jiří Zedníček, Jan Bobrovský, Jiří Pospíšil, Karel Baroch

1971–72: Jiří Zídek Sr., Jan Bobrovský, Jiří Zedníček, Jiří Růžička, Zdeněk Kos

1972–73: Jan Bobrovský, Zdeněk Kos, Jiří Pospíšil, Jiří Zedníček, Jiří Zídek Sr.

1973–74: Zdeněk Kos, Jiří Zídek Sr., Jan Bobrovský, Kamil Brabenec, Jiří Pospíšil

1974–75: Zdeněk Kos, Zdeněk Douša, Jan Bobrovský, Kamil Brabenec, Jiří Pospíšil

1975–76: Vojtěch Petr, Kamil Brabenec, Jan Bobrovský, Stanislav Kropilák, Jiří Konopásek

1976–77: Zdeněk Kos, Stanislav Kropilák, Jan Bobrovský, Jiří Pospíšil, Kamil Brabenec

1977–78: Zdeněk Kos, Stanislav Kropilák, Jan Bobrovský, Jiří Pospíšil, Kamil Brabenec

1978–79: Stanislav Kropilák, Zdeněk Kos, Jiří Pospíšil, Kamil Brabenec, Gustáv Hraška

1979–80: Stanislav Kropilák, Kamil Brabenec, Zdeněk Kos, Gustáv Hraška, Jiří Pospíšil

1980–81: Jaroslav Skála, Stanislav Kropilák, Gustáv Hraška, Vlastimil Havlík, Kamil Brabenec

1981–82: Stanislav Kropilák, Jaroslav Skála, Gustáv Hraška, Vlastibor Klimeš, Zdeněk Böhm

1982–83: Stanislav Kropilák, Jaroslav Skála, Gustáv Hraška, Zdeněk Böhm, Vlastimil Havlík

1983–84: Zdeněk Böhm, Stanislav Kropilák, Jaroslav Skála, Vlastimil Havlík, Kamil Brabenec

1984–85: Stanislav Kropilák, Jaroslav Skála, Zdeněk Böhm, Peter Rajniak, Vlastimil Havlík

1985–86: Vlastimil Havlík, Kamil Brabenec, Oto Matický, Leoš Krejčí, Jaroslav Skála

1986–87: Oto Matický, Vlastimil Havlík, Kamil Brabenec, Juraj Žuffa, Jiří Okáč

1987–88: Oto Matický, Richard Petruška, Josef Jelínek, Jozef Michalko, Štefan Svitek

1988–89: Oto Matický, Richard Petruška, Štefan Svitek, Josef Jelínek, Vladimír Vyoral

1989–90: Josef Jelínek, Vladimír Vyoral, Michal Ježdík, Václav Hrubý, Jozef Michalko

1991–92: Jan Svoboda, Pavel Bečka, Václav Hrubý, Michal Ježdík, Stanislav Kameník

Players with multiple All-Star Five selections
The following table only lists players with at least two total selections.

Czech Republic Player of the Year (1992–present)
The award for the best men's basketball player of the year, with Czech Republic citizenship, from 1992 to the present.

See also
Slovak Player of the Year

Sources
 Pavel Šimák: Historie československého basketbalu v číslech (1932–1985), Basketbalový svaz ÚV ČSTV, květen 1985, 174 stran 
 Pavel Šimák: Historie československého basketbalu v číslech, II. část (1985–1992), Česká a slovenská basketbalová federace, březen 1993, 130 stran 
 Juraj Gacík: Kronika československého a slovenského basketbalu (1919–1993), (1993–2000), vydáno 2000, 1. vyd, slovensky, BADEM, Žilina, 943 stran 
 Jakub Bažant, Jiří Závozda: Nebáli se své odvahy, Československý basketbal v příbězích a faktech, 1. díl (1897–1993), 2014, Olympia, 464 stran

References

External links
Czech Basketball League Official Website 
Eurobasket.com Czech Basketball League Profile
Czech Basketball Federation Official Website 

Basketball in Czechoslovakia
Basketball in the Czech Republic
European basketball awards